Michael Kissane (born 1941) is an Irish retired Gaelic footballer who played for club side St. Vincent's and at inter-county level with the Dublin senior football team.

Career

Kissane first enjoyed success as a schoolboy with St Joseph's, with whom he won a Leinster Colleges Junior Championship title. His performances quickly brought him to the notice of the county selectors and he was left wing-back on the Dublin minor team that won the All-Ireland Championship in 1958 when Mayo were beaten in the final. Kissane captained the team to a second successive title the following year before lining out with the Dublin junior team in 1960. He dropped out of Gaelic football the following year but was coaxed out of his premature retirement and made his Dublin senior team debut in the National League against Louth in November 1962. Kissane won Leinster Championship medals in 1963 and 1965. He was part of the Dublin squad that defeated Galway in the 1963 All-Ireland final.

Honours

St. Vincent's
Dublin Senior Football Championship: 1962, 1964, 1966, 1967, 1970

Dublin
All-Ireland Senior Football Championship: 1963
Leinster Senior Football Championship: 1963, 1965
All-Ireland Minor Football Championship: 1958, 1959
Leinster Minor Football Championship: 1958, 1959

References

1940 births
Living people
St Vincents (Dublin) Gaelic footballers
Dublin inter-county Gaelic footballers